Charles Sitgreaves (April 22, 1803, Easton, Pennsylvania – March 17, 1878, Phillipsburg, New Jersey) was an American Democratic Party politician who represented New Jersey's 3rd congressional district for two terms from 1865 to 1869.

Early life and education
Sitgreaves was born in Easton, Pennsylvania on April 22, 1803, and moved with his parents to New Jersey in 1806. He pursued classical studies. He studied law; was admitted to the bar in 1824 and commenced practice in Phillipsburg, New Jersey.

Career
He was member of the New Jersey General Assembly from 1831–1833 and the New Jersey Legislative Council from 1834-1835. He was a major commandant in the New Jersey militia from 1828–1838, and served in the New Jersey Senate from 1851-1854. He was president of the Belvidere and Delaware River Railway. Sitgreaves served as the Mayor of Phillipsburg, New Jersey in 1861 and 1862, and was president of the National Bank of Phillipsburg from 1856 to 1878.

Congress
Sitgreaves was elected as a Democrat to the Thirty-ninth Congress and Fortieth Congress, and served in office from March 4, 1865 – March 3, 1869, and was not a candidate for renomination in 1868.

Later career and death
After leaving Congress, he engaged in banking and railroading. He died in Phillipsburg on March 17, 1878, and was interred in Seventh Street Cemetery in Easton.

External links

Charles Sitgreaves at The Political Graveyard

1803 births
1878 deaths
Mayors of places in New Jersey
Members of the New Jersey Legislative Council
Democratic Party members of the New Jersey General Assembly
New Jersey lawyers
Politicians from Easton, Pennsylvania
Politicians from Warren County, New Jersey
Democratic Party members of the United States House of Representatives from New Jersey
People from Phillipsburg, New Jersey
19th-century American politicians
19th-century American lawyers